Swan bands are a characteristic of the spectra of carbon stars, comets and of burning hydrocarbon fuels. They are named for the Scottish physicist William Swan, who first studied the spectral analysis of radical diatomic carbon (C2) in 1856.

Swan bands consist of several sequences of vibrational bands scattered throughout the visible spectrum.

See also
Spectroscopy

References

Emission spectroscopy
Fire
Astronomical spectroscopy
Astrochemistry
Carbon